Kookmin may refer to:

Kookmin Bank, a South Korean bank
Kookmin University, a South Korean university
Kukmin Ilbo, a South Korean newspaper